Filamins are a class of proteins that hold two actin filaments at large angles. Filamin protein in mammals is made up of an actin-binding domain at its N-terminus that is followed by 24 immunoglobulin-like repeat modules of roughly 95 amino acids. There are two hinge regions; between repeats 15-16 and 23-24. Filamin gets cleaved at these hinge regions to generate smaller fragments of the protein. Filamin has two actin-binding sites with a V-linkage between them, so that it cross-links actin filaments into a network with the filaments orientated almost at right angles to one another.

Filamin proteins include:
 FLNA
 FLNB
 FLNC

Over-expression of FLNA stops the regeneration of bladder carcinoma (BC) cells, by inhibiting the cell cycle and inducing apoptosis of BC cells. FLNA has also been shown to reduce the mobility and invasion abilities of BC cells.

References

External links 
 

Human proteins
Proteins